Hotel Terminus: The Life and Times of Klaus Barbie (French:  Hôtel Terminus: Klaus Barbie, sa vie et son temps) is a 1988 American documentary film directed by Marcel Ophuls about the life of Nazi war criminal Klaus Barbie. The film covers Barbie's relatively innocent childhood, his time with the Gestapo in Lyon (where he apparently excelled at torture), through to the forty years between the end of World War II and his eventual deportation from Bolivia to stand trial for crimes against humanity in France. The film explores a number of themes, including the nature of evil and the diffusion of responsibility in hierarchical situations.

The film won the 1988 Academy Award for Best Documentary Feature, as well as the FIPRESCI Award at the 1988 Cannes Film Festival.

Synopsis
The film features interviews from both supporters and opponents of Barbie's trial, from journalists to former U.S. Counter Intelligence Corps agents to independent investigators of Nazi war crimes to Barbie's defense attorney. Much of the testimony presented is contradictory: for example, some interviewees allege that Barbie was brought to trial as a figurehead while others allege that he was allowed to go free for forty years as a result of the protection of various governments (including those of the United States and Bolivia), because Barbie knew secret agents and a public trial could potentially jeopardize various intelligence operations. Some of those interviewed by Ophuls included Barbie's lawyer Jacques Vergès, the writer Günter Grass, the American intelligence officer Eugene Kolb who insisted that Barbie was "too professional" to have tortured people, the philosopher Régis Debray who was captured by the Bolivian Army in 1967, Daniel Cordier who served as the secretary to Jean Moulin, the Nazi hunters Serge Klarsfeld and his wife Beate Klarsfeld, the philosopher Alain Finkielkraut, the Gestapo officer Harry Stengritt, the poet René Tavernier, Jean-Marie Le Pen of the Front national, the Catholic priest Ivo Omrcanin who helped to smuggle Barbie into Bolivia, the Frenchwoman Simone Lagrange who was deported by Barbie from Lyon to Auschwitz, the former Bolivian president General Guido Vildoso who employed Barbie as his "security consultant", the student radical Daniel Cohn-Bendit, the filmmaker Claude Lanzmann (Shoah), the résistant Raymond Aubrac and his wife Lucie Aubrac, the résistant René Hardy, and Hardy's former mistress Lydie Bastien who claimed to have magical powers to bring bad luck on anyone who displeased her.

Within the course of the film, Barbie is brought to trial and sentenced to life in prison; near the end of the film, his defense attorney vows to appeal the decision.

Release
Hotel Terminus: The Life and Times of Klaus Barbie had its world premiere at the Cannes Film Festival on 10 May 1988. It was later shown at the New York Film Festival on 6 October 1988, followed by screenings in New York on October 9, 1988 and October 26, 1988.

See also
Hôtel Terminus
Claude Bourdet
Counterintelligence Corps (United States Army)
Elizabeth Holtzman
Guido Vildoso
Izieu
Jacques Vergès
Jean Moulin
Paul Paillole
Ratlines (World War II)
Régis Debray

References

External links

 Hotel Terminus at Icarus Films

1988 films
American documentary films
Films set in Lyon
French documentary films
Best Documentary Feature Academy Award winners
Films directed by Marcel Ophuls
Documentary films about war crimes
1988 documentary films
Documentary films about Nazis
The Samuel Goldwyn Company films
1980s American films
1980s French films